Tiempo may refer to:

Music
 Tiempo (album), a 2003 album by Erreway
 "Tiempo" (Cetu Javu song) (1994)
 "Tiempo" (Erreway song) (2003)

Other uses
 Tiempo (magazine), a Spanish-language weekly
 Tiempo (programme), a programme relating to global warming

People with the surname
 César Tiempo, (1906–1980), Russian-born screenwriter of Argentine cinema
 Edilberto K. Tiempo (1913–1996), Filipino writer and professor, husband of Edith
 Edith Tiempo (1919–2011), Filipina writer, wife of Edilberto
 Rowena Tiempo Torrevillas (born 1951), Filipina poet, fiction writer and essayist, daughter of Edilberto and Edith
 Sergio Tiempo (born 1972), Argentine classical pianist

See also
 A Tiempo (disambiguation)
 El Tiempo (disambiguation)
 Mi tiempo, a 2007 album by Chayanne
 Nike Tiempo, a sports brand
 Nuevo Tiempo, a Spanish-language Christian TV and radio station for Central and South America
 Tempo (disambiguation)
 

Surnames of Spanish origin